Aşağı Malax (also, Ashaga Malakh) is a village and municipality in the Qakh Rayon of Azerbaijan.  It has a population of 304.

References 

Populated places in Qakh District